Pseudhammus oculifrons is a species of beetle in the family Cerambycidae. It was described by Chevrolat in 1856, originally under the genus Monohammus.

References

oculifrons
Beetles described in 1856